This is a list of now defunct airlines from Ivory Coast.

See also
 List of airlines of Ivory Coast
 List of airports in Ivory Coast

References

Ivory Coast
Airlines
Airlines, defunct